Garmeh County is located in North Khorasan province, Iran. The capital of the county is Garmeh. At the 2006 census, the region's population (as parts of Jajarm County) was 24,163. The following census in 2011 counted 24,599 people in 7,039 households, by which time those parts had been separated from the county to form Garmeh County. At the 2016 census the county's population was 25,475 in 7,748 households.

Administrative divisions

The population history and structural changes of Garmeh County's administrative divisions over three consecutive censuses are shown in the following table. The latest census shows one district, two rural districts, and three cities.

References

 

Counties of North Khorasan Province